The Ohio general elections, 2016 were held on November 8, 2016 throughout Ohio. The close of registration for electors in the primary election was December 16, 2015, and the primary election took place on March 15, 2016.

Federal

President

Senate

Incumbent Republican Senator Rob Portman won re-election to a second term in office, defeating former governor Ted Strickland.

House of Representatives

All of Ohio's 16 seats in the United States House of Representatives were up for election in 2016.

State

General Assembly

Summary
Senate

Senate

The 16 even-numbered districts out of 33 seats in the Ohio Senate were up for election in 2016. Twelve of these seats were held by Republicans, three were held by Democrats, and one seat was vacant. Prior to the election, Republicans held 23 seats and Democrats held 10 seats; after the election, Republicans gained an additional seat, giving them a 24 to 9 majority.

House of Representatives

All 99 seats in the Ohio House of Representatives were up for election in 2016. Prior to the election, Republicans held 65 seats and Democrats held 34 seats; after the election, Republicans gained an additional seat, giving them a 66 to 33 majority.

Supreme Court

While judicial races in Ohio are technically non-partisan (party affiliations are not listed on the ballot), candidates run in party primaries. Terms are six years, and justices may run for re-election an unlimited number of times before their 70th birthday. The Supreme Court currently consists of 6 Republicans and 1 Democrat.

Chief Justice

Republican primary

Candidates
Maureen O'Connor, incumbent Chief Justice of the Supreme Court of Ohio

Results

General election

Results

Associate Justice (Term commencing 01/01/2017)
Justice Judith Ann Lanzinger, a Republican, did not seek reelection, as she had reached the mandatory retirement age.

Republican primary

Candidates
Patrick F. Fischer, incumbent Judge of the Ohio Court of Appeals for the 1st District
Colleen Mary O'Toole, incumbent Judge of the Ohio Court of Appeals for the 11th District

Results

Democratic primary

Candidates
John P. O'Donnell, Cuyahoga County Court of Common Pleas judge and candidate for Ohio Supreme Court in 2014

Results

General election

Results

Associate Justice (Term commencing 01/02/2017)
Justice Paul Pfeifer, a Republican, did not seek reelection, as he had reached the mandatory retirement age.

Republican primary

Candidates
Pat DeWine, incumbent Judge of the Ohio Court of Appeals for the 1st District and son of Mike DeWine, incumbent Ohio Attorney General and former U.S. Senator

Results

Democratic primary

Candidates
Cynthia Rice, incumbent Judge of the Ohio Court of Appeals for the 11th District

Results

General election

Results

Courts of Appeal

The Ohio District Courts of Appeals consists of 69 judges in 12 districts. Judges serve a 6-year term. Twenty-seven of these positions were up for election in 2016.

References

 
Ohio